Neivelivadapathy is a village in the Orathanadu taluk of Thanjavur district, Tamil Nadu, India.

Demographics 

As per the 2001 census, Neivelivadapathy had a total population of 5134 with 2563 males and 2571 females. The sex ratio was 1003. The literacy rate was 56.63.

Panchayat President: Pandian Kunjappa and Vice President: Natesan R (Pallaththanamani Street)

Post Office Details Of Neivelivadapathy in Thanjavur, India

Contact Address: Postmaster, Post Office Neivelivadapathy, Thanjavur, Tamil Nadu (TN), India (IN), Pin Code:- 614628
Pin Code: 614628
State: Tamil Nadu
District: Thanjavur
Post Office: Neivelivadapathy
Post Office Neivelivadapathy, Thanjavur

Schools
 5 - Panchayat Union Primary School corresponding School ids are 30069, 30070, 30071, 30072, 30073
Union Middle School Narippaththai, Neivelyvadapathy
Govt Higher Secondary School Neivelithenpathy

Temples
Ayyanaar Temple, 
Karuppaiah Temple, 
Maruthappa temple, 
Muniyappachi Temple
Thottathumuni Temple,

Pallathaanmani Street
Ayyanaar Temple
Pathrakaliamman Temple

Naripaththai Street
Peththapermal Temple

Setti Street
Vinayakar temple

References 

 

Villages in Thanjavur district